The Opa-locka Company administration building is a historic site in Opa-locka, Florida. It is located at 777 Sharazad Boulevard. On March 22, 1982, it was added to the U.S. National Register of Historic Places.

This property is part of the Opa-locka Thematic Resource Area, a multiple-property submission to the National Register. It is a boarded-up ruin as of October 2017.

References

External links
 Dade County listings at National Register of Historic Places
 Florida's Office of Cultural and Historical Programs
 Dade County listings
 City Hall

Buildings and structures in Miami-Dade County, Florida
National Register of Historic Places in Miami-Dade County, Florida
Opa-locka, Florida